KMG may refer to:

Music
 KMG the Illustrator, member of the rap group Above the Law
 KMG Records (Killen Music Group), a Christian record label
 The KMG's (Krazy Mess Groovers), a Belgian musical group

Companies
 Kantipur Media Group, Nepal
 KazMunayGas, the state-owned oil and gas company of Kazakhstan
 Kerr-McGee, an energy company involved in the exploration and production of oil and gas
 Klynveld Main Goerdeler (KMG), a predecessor of the professional services company KPMG
 KMG Company, a Dutch company manufacturing amusement rides
 KMG Group (Killarney Manufacturing Group), an Irish engineering company

Other organisations
 KMG Ethiopia, an Ethiopian women's rights group

Other uses
 Kâte language, ISO 639 language code
 Kunming Changshui International Airport, IATA code KMG, serving Kunming, China
 Kunming Wujiaba International Airport, former IATA code KMG, the old Kunming airport
 Kisari Mohan Ganguli, a translator of the Hindu epic Mahabharata